Scopula melanstigma is a moth of the  family Geometridae. It is found in India (Sikkim).

References

Moths described in 1938
melanopis
Moths of Asia